The Carmel Valley AVA is an American Viticultural Area in Monterey County, California, east of Carmel-by-the-Sea. The AVA is home to a number of wineries and vineyards, as well as the town of Carmel Valley Village. Wineries with tasting rooms in Carmel Valley include Bernardus, Boëté, Boekenoogen, Chateau Sinnet, Folktale Winery and Vineyards, Galante, Georis, Joyce Vineyards, Heller Estate (Currently Massa. Formerly Durney), Holman Ranch, Joullian Vineyards, Talbott. The Monterey-Salinas Transit  Route 24 public bus, named the Grapevine Express, runs through the Carmel Valley stopping at most of the tasting rooms. 

County Route G16 runs through the valley while the Carmel River flows on the valley floor.

See also 
 California wine

References 

American Viticultural Areas
American Viticultural Areas of California
Geography of Monterey County, California
Santa Lucia Range
1982 establishments in California